Zubovai Palace (or Didždvaris) is a former palace of Prince Platon Zubov in Šiauliai, Aušros alley 50. Currently it is occupied by the Šiauliai University Faculty of Arts.

References

Šiaulių dvaro sodyba, vad. Didžiadvariu 

Buildings and structures in Šiauliai
Palaces in Lithuania
Classicism architecture in Lithuania
Houses completed in 1765